Hedvig Bjelkevik (born 18 April 1981) is a Norwegian speed skater. She was born in Arendal and is the sister of Annette Bjelkevik. She competed in the 1,500 metres and team pursuit at the 2006 Winter Olympics in Turin.

References

External links 
 

1981 births
Living people
People from Arendal
Norwegian female speed skaters
Olympic speed skaters of Norway
Speed skaters at the 2006 Winter Olympics
Norwegian twins
Twin sportspeople
Sportspeople from Agder